The Bad Kids is a 2016 documentary film about students at risk of dropping out who attend an alternative school in Yucca Valley, California.

Synopsis
The film follows three at-risk students during a year at Black Rock Continuation High School. It captures Principal Vonda Viland as she coaches the teens: Lee Bridges, who has a young son with a classmate and is facing the challenge of supporting his family; Jennifer Coffield, who lacks family support for her scholastic efforts; and Joey McGee, who grapples with drug use and instability at home.

Release
The Bad Kids had its world premiere at the 2016 Sundance Film Festival. After its theatrical run, it aired on the PBS series Independent Lens.

References

External links

The Bad Kids at Independent Lens

2016 films
2016 documentary films
American documentary films
Films shot in California
Documentary films about high school in the United States
Documentary films about adolescence
Films about teacher–student relationships
2010s English-language films
2010s American films